Suctobelbidae is a family of mites belonging to the order Sarcoptiformes.

Genera

Genera:
 Allosuctobelba Moritz, 1970
 Bruneibelba Mahunka, 2001
 Coartobelba Mahunka, 2001

References

Sarcoptiformes